Arthur Warren Samuels (19 May 1852 – 11 May 1925) was an Irish Unionist Alliance Member of Parliament (MP) in the United Kingdom Parliament and subsequently a Judge. The Irish Unionists were the Irish wing of the Conservative Party.

Biography
He was born in Dún Laoghaire, County Dublin, second son of Arthur Samuels, a solicitor, and Katherine Daly, daughter of Owen Daly of Mornington, County Meath. He attended Trinity College Dublin, before being called to the Irish Bar in 1877. He became a Queen's Counsel (QC) in 1894 and was called to the English bar in 1896.

Samuels was Solicitor-General for Ireland 1917–1918 and Attorney-General for Ireland in 1918–1919. He was also made a member of the Privy Council of Ireland in 1918.

He was MP for Dublin University from 1917 to 1919, having previously been defeated in a 1903 by-election for the same constituency.

Samuels left the House of Commons when he was appointed to the office of Justice of the King's Bench Division of the High Court of Justice in Ireland in 1919, an office which he held until the court's abolition under the Courts of Justice Act 1924. In common with most of the judges of the old regime, he was not appointed to the High Court established under the 1924 Act. He died a year later.

Maurice Healy in The Old Munster Circuit praised his personal qualities, his erudition and his valuable book on the financial aspects of Home Rule; but as a Law Officer and judge dismissed him as "undistinguished".

Family
He married in 1881 Emma Margaret Irwin, daughter of the Reverend James Irwin of Howth, by whom he was the father of the barrister and writer Arthur P. I. Samuels (1886–1916) and Dorothy Samuels (1892–1942).

The younger Arthur was an authority on Edmund Burke and edited a collection of his correspondence and writings, which he had almost completed when his work was interrupted by the outbreak of World War I. He became a captain in the Royal Irish Rifles, and was killed on the Western Front  in September 1916. His father completed his book on Burke, which was published in 1923. Young Arthur had married Dorothy Young of Milltown, County Antrim, in 1913.

Samuels' daughter, Dorothy Helen Daly (1892–1942), served during World War 2 as an ambulance driver with the American Ambulance Great Britain. She was killed by a German air raid during the Exeter Blitz on 4 May 1942. She had married Herbert James Daly but was widowed at the time of her death.

References

Sources
 Who's Who of British Members of Parliament, Vol. III 1919–1945, edited by M. Stenton & S. Lees (The Harvester Press 1979)

External links 

 Samuels' book on Home Rule Finance, 1912; online pdf.
Healy, Maurice  The Old Munster Circuit Michael Joseph Ltd. London 1939.

1852 births
1925 deaths
Alumni of Trinity College Dublin
Members of the Parliament of the United Kingdom for Dublin University
Members of the Privy Council of Ireland
Solicitors-General for Ireland
Attorneys-General for Ireland
Irish barristers
Irish Conservative Party MPs
Irish Unionist Party MPs
UK MPs 1918–1922
Judges of the High Court of Justice in Ireland
People from Dún Laoghaire
19th-century King's Counsel
Irish Queen's Counsel
Teachtaí Dála for Dublin University